The International Journal of Rock Mechanics and Mining Sciences is a peer-reviewed scientific journal published by Elsevier. The editor-in-chief is Robert Zimmerman. The focus of this journal is original research, site measurements, and case studies in rock mechanics and rock engineering pertaining to mining and civil engineering.

Abstracting and indexing 
The journal is abstracted and indexed in:

External links 
 

Elsevier academic journals
Publications established in 1997
English-language journals
Mining journals